Hans Moller (b. Wuppertal, Germany 1905 - d. October 19, 2000 in Allentown, Pennsylvania) was a German-born American artist who worked mostly in an abstract format and is primarily considered to have been a colorist.

Biography
From 1919 until 1927, Moller was an instructor at the Kunstgewerbeschule Wuppertal-Barmen, an arts and crafts learning institution in the town in which he resided and also earned money as a bricklayer.  Next he studied at the Academy of Fine Arts in Berlin.

In 1936, he emigrated to the United States from Germany to protect his Jewish wife (whom he had married in 1933), Helen Rosenblum from the Nazis.  Once settled in the U.S. he went to work for the advertising firm Lord and Thomas as a graphic designer and works of his from that endeavor were exhibited at MOMA as part of a group exhibition in 1949.  The first solo exhibition of his paintings  was held in 1942 at the Bonestell Gallery in New York City.   In the following twenty years or so he had some twenty five solo exhibitions at various galleries.   Moller created paintings in a multiplicity of styles, including; expressionism, abstractionism, surrealism, cubism, pointillism, and fauvism.   Later he was represented for a stretch ending in 1995 by the Midtown-Payson Gallery in New York City. Therein in 1995 the Dusseldorf gallerist Torsten Bröhan put together an exhibition of Moller's work; it was the first solo exhibition of Moller's work in Germany.

Moller was known foremost as a colorist and once stated...“I only want to wake up every day and decide what colors to paint my sky.”.

Ad Reinhardt included Moller in his 1946 work "How to Look at Modern Art in America".

Personal life
Moller and his wife were long time residents of Allentown. His wife Helen predeceased him in 1997. Hans Moller died in 2000.

Legacy
Following Moller's death a retrospective of the painter's work was mounted at the Lore Degenstein Gallery at Susquehanna University with an accompanying catalogue published by the Penn State University Press.  The exhibition then traveled around Pennsylvania from 2001 until 2002 and then to the Portland Art Museum in Portland, Maine.  Moller's works are held in the collections of the Museum of Modern Art, the Whitney Museum of American Art, the Brooklyn Museum of Art, the Hirshhorn Museum and Sculpture Garden, and the Allentown Art Museum.

References

1905 births
2000 deaths
Artists from Wuppertal
20th-century German painters
20th-century American male artists
20th-century American painters
German graphic designers
Emigrants from Nazi Germany to the United States
American graphic designers
Painters from Pennsylvania
Artists from Allentown, Pennsylvania